Freezywater is a neighbourhood of the traditional broad definition of Enfield in the London Borough of Enfield, north London. It has a border with Hertfordshire. It is between Bullsmoor to the west, Enfield Lock to the east, Enfield Wash to the south, and Waltham Cross, Hertfordshire to the north. It became more than a hamlet at the beginning of the 20th century.

Freezywater occupies a zone straddling Hertford Road from its junction with Ordnance Road in the south to Bullsmoor Lane and the Holmesdale Tunnel overpass in the north. It is generally deemed to commence westwards from the Liverpool Street to Cheshunt railway.

Etymology 
First recorded as Freezywater (1768) and Freezy Water (1819); the local farm choosing to name itself after its fishpond or duck pond which was liable to freeze.

Local history

For centuries this area was farmed principally by three farms and smallholdings, the greatest being Freezywater Farm which was long one of the manor's tenant farms, the others being Totteridge House and Freezywater House. In the 18th century this was called Freezy Water Farm, and later developments largely informally took on the name until the completion of its church in 1906.

During World War II, Chesterfield School was hit by a V1 flying bomb aimed for the Royal Small Arms Factory, about  due east of the school. There was one fatality in the grounds, a teacher looking for her school children.

The church of Saint George, a large red-brick gothic building designed by JEK and JP Cutts, was built between 1900 and 1906. A planned tower was never constructed. It replaced a temporary iron church on a site next to it which remained in use as a church hall for many years.

Nearest places 
Immediately
 Bullsmoor
 Waltham Cross
 Enfield Lock
 Enfield Wash
Beyond
 Waltham Abbey
 Enfield Town
 Brimsdown
 Cheshunt
 Chingford

Nearest railway stations
 Enfield Lock railway station
 Waltham Cross railway station
 Turkey Street railway station

Schools
 Primary schools: Chesterfield Infant School, Chesterfield Junior School,  Freezywater St George's Primary School (Church of England), Honilands School
 Secondary school: Lea Valley Academy (formerly Bullsmoor Secondary school)

Open spaces
 Cunningham Park

References

Places in Enfield, London
Areas of London
Districts of the London Borough of Enfield